Iveta Benešová and Barbora Záhlavová-Strýcová successfully defended their last year's title, defeating Anna-Lena Grönefeld and Vania King 6–7(8), 6–2, [10–6] in the final.

Seeds

Draw

Draw

External links
 Main Draw

Monterrey Open - Doubles
Monterrey Open